Mirza Nur-ud-Din Muhammad Salim (30 August 1569 – 28 October 1627), known by his imperial name Jahangir, was the fourth Mughal Emperor, who ruled from 1605 until his death in 1627. He was the third and only surviving son of Akbar and his chief empress, Mariam-uz-Zamani, born to them in the year 1569. He was named after the Indian Sufi saint, Salim Chishti.

Early life 

Prince Salim was the third son born to Akbar and his favourite Queen Consort, Mariam-uz-Zamani in Fatehpur Sikri on 30 August 1569. He had two elder brothers, Hassan Mirza and Hussain Mirza, born as twins to his parents in 1564, both of whom died in infancy. Since these children had died in infancy, Akbar sought the blessing of holy men for an heir-apparent to his empire.

When Akbar was informed of the news that his chief Hindu wife was expecting a child, an order was passed for the establishment of a royal palace in Sikri near the lodgings of Shaikh Salim Chisti, where the Empress could enjoy the repose being in the vicinity of the revered saint. Mariam was shifted to the palace established there and during her pregnancy, Akbar himself used to travel to Sikri and used to spend half of his time in Sikri and another half in Agra. When Mariam-uz-Zamani was near her confinement, she was shifted to the humble dwelling of Shaikh Salim by Akbar where she gave birth to Prince Salim. He was named after Shaikh Salim given the faith of Akbar in the efficacy of the prayers of the holy man. Akbar, overjoyed with the news of his heir-apparent, ordered a great feast on the occasion of his birth and ordered the release of criminals with the great offence. Throughout the empire, largesses were bestowed over common people, and he set himself ready to visit Sikri immediately. However, he was advised by his courtiers to delay his visit to Sikri on the account of the astrological belief in Hindustan of a father not seeing the face of his long-awaited son immediately after his birth. He, therefore, delayed his visit and visited Sikri to meet his wife and son after forty-one days after his birth.

Jahangir's foster mother was the daughter of the Indian Sufi saint, Salim Chishti, and his foster brother was Qutubuddin Koka(originally Sheikh Kubhu), the grandson of Chishti.

Salim started his learning at the age of five. On this occasion, a big feast was thrown by Emperor Akbar, ceremonially initiating his son into education. His first tutor was Qutb-ud-din. After some time he was inaugurated into strategic reasoning and military warfare by several tutors. His maternal uncle, Bhagwant Das was supposedly one of his tutors on the subject of warfare tactics. Salim grew up fluent in Persian and premodern Hindi, with a "respectable" knowledge of Turkic, the Mughal ancestral language.

Reign 

He succeeded the throne on Thursday, 3 November 1605, eight days after his father's death. Salim ascended to the throne with the title of Nur-ud-din Muhammad Jahangir Badshah Ghazi, and thus began his 22-year reign at the age of 36. Jahangir, soon after, had to fend off his own son, Prince Khusrau Mirza, when the latter attempted to claim the throne based on Akbar's will to become his next heir. Khusrau Mirza was defeated in 1606 and confined in the fort of Agra. Jahangir considered his third son, Prince Khurram (regnal name Shah Jahan) as his favourite son. As punishment, Khusrau Mirza was handed over to his younger brother and was partially blinded. In October 1616, Jahangir sent Prince Khurram to fight against the combined forces of Ahmednagar, Bijapur and Golconda. However when Nur Jahan married her daughter, Ladli Begum, to Jahangir's youngest son, Shahryar Mirza in February 1621, Khurram suspected that his stepmother was trying to manevour Shahryar as the successor to Jahangir. Using the rugged terrain of the Deccan to this advantage, Khurram launched a rebellion against Jahangir in 1622. This precipitated a political crisis in Jahangir's court. Khurram murdered his blind older brother, Khusrau Mirza, in order to smoothen his own path to the throne. 

Simultaneously, the Safavid ruler Shah Abbas attacked Kandahar in winter of 1622. Being a commercial center at the border of the Mughal Empire and the burial place of Babur, the founder of the Mughal dynasty, Jahangir dispatched Shahryar to repel the Safavids. However, due to Shahryar's inexperience and harsh Afghan winter, Kandahar fell to the Safavids. In March 1623, Jahangir ordered Mahabat Khan, one of Jahangir's most loyal generals, to crush Khurram's rebellion in the Deccan. After a series of victories by Mahabat Khan over Khurram, the civil war finally ended in October 1625.

Foreign relations 

The East India Company persuaded King James to send Sir Thomas Roe as a royal envoy to the Agra court of Jahangir. Roe resided at Agra for three years, until 1619.  At the Mughal court, Roe allegedly became a favourite of Jahangir and may have been his drinking partner; certainly he arrived with gifts of "many crates of red wine" and explained to him "What beer was? How was it made?".

The immediate result of the mission was to obtain permission and protection for an East India Company factory at Surat. While no major trading privileges were conceded by Jahingir, "Roe's mission was the beginning of a Mughal-Company relationship that would develop into something approaching a partnership and see the EIC gradually drawn into the Mughal nexus".

While Roe's detailed journals are a valuable source of information on Jahangir's reign, the Emperor did not return the favour, with no mention of Roe in his own voluminous diaries.

In 1623, Emperor Jahangir sent his tahwildar, Khan Alam, to Safavid Persia, accompanied by 800 sepoys, scribes and scholars, along with ten howdahs well decorated in gold and silver, in order to negotiate peace with Abbas I of Persia after a brief conflict in the region around Kandahar. Khan Alam soon returned with valuable gifts and groups of Mir Shikar (Hunt Masters) from both Safavid Persia and the Khanates of Central Asia.

In 1626, Jahangir began to contemplate an alliance between the Ottomans, Mughals and Uzbeks against the Safavids, who had defeated the Mughals at Kandahar. He even wrote a letter to the Ottoman Sultan, Murad IV. Jahangir's ambition did not materialise however, due to his death in 1627.

Marriages 
Salim's first and chief wife was the daughter of his maternal uncle Raja Bhagwant Das, Shah Begum, to whom he was betrothed in his tender years. His Mansab was raised to Twelve Thousand, in 1585, at the time of his marriage to Shah Begum. Nizamuddin remarks that she was considered to be the best and most suitable princess as the first wife of Prince Salim. Abul Fazl in Akbarnama illustrates her as a jewel of chastity and describes her as an extremely beautiful woman whose purity adorned her high extraction and was endowed with remarkable beauty and graces.

The marriage with Man Bai took place on 24 February 1585 in her native town Amer which was also the native town of his mother, Mariam-uz-Zamani. Akbar alongside several other nobles of the court personally visited Amer and followed this marriage. A lavish ceremony took place and the bride's palanquin was carried by Akbar and Salim for some distance in her honor. She became one of his favorite wives. Jahangir notes that he was extremely fond of her and designated her as his chief consort in the royal harem in his princely days. Jahangir also records his attachment and affection for her and makes notes of her unwavering devotion towards him. Jahangir honored her with the title Shah Begum after she gave birth to Khusrau Mirza, the eldest son of Jahangir.

One of his early favorite wives was a Rajput princess, Manavati bai, daughter of Raja Udai Singh Rathore of Marwar. The marriage was solemnized on 11 January 1586 at the bride's residence. Jahangir named her Jagat Gosain and she gave birth to Prince Khurram, the future Shah Jahan, who was Jahangir's successor to the throne.

On 26 June 1586, he married a daughter of Raja Rai Singh, Maharaja of Bikaner. In July 1586, he married Malika Shikar Begum, daughter of Abu Sa'id Khan Chagatai. Also in 1586, he married Sahib-i-Jamal Begum, daughter of Khwaja Hassan of Herat, a cousin of Zain Khan Koka.

In 1587, he married Malika Jahan Begum, daughter of Bhim Singh, Maharaja of Jaisalmer. He also married the daughter of Raja Darya Malbhas.

In October 1590, he married Zohra Begum, daughter of Mirza Sanjar Hazara. He married Karamsi, daughter of Raja Kesho Das Rathore of Merta. On 11 January 1592, he married Kanwal Rani, daughter of Ali Sher Khan, by his wife, Gul Khatun. In October 1592, he married a daughter of Husain Chak of Kashmir. In January/March 1593, he married Nur un-Nisa Begum, daughter of Ibrahim Husain Mirza, by his wife, Gulrukh Begum, daughter of Kamran Mirza. In September 1593, he married a daughter of Ali Khan Faruqi, Raja of Khandesh. He also married a daughter of Abdullah Khan Baluch.

On 28 June 1596, he married Khas Mahal Begum, daughter of Zain Khan Koka, Subadar of Kabul, and Lahore. This marriage was initially opposed by Akbar as he did not approve of the marriage of cousins to the same man however seeing the melancholy of Salim being refused to marry her, Akbar approved of this union. She became one of his chief consorts after her marriage.

In 1608, he married Saliha Banu Begum, daughter of Qasim Khan, a senior member of the Imperial Household. She became one of his chief consorts and was designated the title of Padshah Begum and for most of the reign of Jahangir retained this title. After her death, this title was passed to Nur Jahan.

On 17 June 1608, he married Koka Kumari Begum, eldest daughter of Jagat Singh, Yuvraj of Amber. This marriage was held at the palace of Jahangir's mother, Mariam-uz-Zamani. On 11 January 1610, he married the daughter of Ram Chand Bundela.

At some point, he had also married a daughter of Mirza Muhammad Hakim, son of Emperor Humayun. She was also one of the chief consorts of Jahangir.

Jahangir married Mehr-un-Nissa (better known by her subsequent title of Nur Jahan) on 25 May 1611. She was the widow of Sher Afgan. Mehr-un-Nissa became his most favorite wife after their marriage and was one of the chief consorts of Jahangir. She was witty, intelligent, and beautiful, which was what attracted Jahangir to her. Before being awarded the title of Nur Jahan ('Light of the World'), she was called Nur Mahal ('Light of the Palace'). After the death of Saliha Bano Begum in 1620, she was designated the title of Padshah Begum and held it until the death of Jahangir in 1627. Her abilities are said to range from fashion designing to building architectural monuments.

Conquests 

In the year 1594, Jahangir was dispatched by his father, the Emperor Akbar, alongside Asaf Khan, also known as Mirza Jafar Beg and Abu'l-Fazl ibn Mubarak, to defeat the renegade Vir Singh Deo of Bundela and to capture the city of Orchha, which was considered the centre of the revolt. Jahangir arrived with a force of 12,000 after many ferocious encounters and finally subdued the Bundela and ordered Vir Singh Deo to surrender. After tremendous casualties and the start of negotiations between the two, Vir Singh Deo handed over 5000 Bundela infantry and 1000 cavalry, but he feared Mughal retaliation and remained a fugitive until his death. The victorious Jahangir, at 26 years of age, ordered the completion of the Jahangir Mahal a famous Mughal citadel in Orchha to commemorate and honour his victory.

Jahangir then gathered his forces under the command of Ali Kuli Khan and fought Lakshmi Narayan of Koch Bihar. Lakshmi Narayan then accepted the Mughals as his suzerains and was given the title Nazir, later establishing a garrison at Atharokotha.

In 1613, Jahangir issued a sanguinary order for the extirpation of the race of the Kolis who were notorious robbers and plunders living in the most inaccessible parts of Gujarat. A large number of them Koli chiefs slaughtered and the rest hunted to their mountains and deserts. 169 heads of such Koli chiefs killed in battle by Nurulla Ibrahim, commander of 'Bollodo'.

In 1613, the Portuguese seized the Mughal ship Rahimi, which had set out from Surat on its way with a large cargo of 100,000 rupees and Pilgrims, who were on their way to Mecca and Medina in order to attend the annual Hajj. The Rahimi was owned by Mariam-uz-Zamani, mother of Jahangir and Akbar's favourite consort. She was bestowed the title of 'Mallika-e-Hindustan' (Queen of Hindustan) by Akbar and was subsequently referred as same during Jahangir's reign. The Rahimi was the largest Indian ship sailing in the Red Sea and was known to the Europeans as the "great pilgrimage ship". When the Portuguese officially refused to return the ship and the passengers, the outcry at the Mughal court was unusually severe. The outrage was compounded by the fact that the owner and the patron of the ship was none other than the revered mother of the current emperor. Jahangir himself was outraged and ordered the seizure of the Portuguese town Daman. He ordered the apprehension of all Portuguese within the Mughal Empire; he further confiscated churches that belonged to the Jesuits. This episode is considered to be an example of the struggle for wealth that would later ensue and lead to colonisation of the Indian sub-continent.

Jahangir was responsible for ending a century long struggle with the state of Mewar. The campaign against the Rajputs was pushed so extensively that they were made to submit with great loss of life and property.

In 1608, Jahangir posted Islam Khan I to subdue the rebel Musa Khan, the Masnad-e Ala of the Baro-Bhuyan confederacy in Bengal, who was able to imprison him. Jahangir also  captured Kangra Fort in 1615, whose rulers came under Mughal vassalship during the reign of Akbar. Consequently, a siege was laid and the fort was taken in 1620, which "resulted in the submission of the Raja of Chamba who was the greatest of all the rajas in the region." The district of Kishtwar, in the state of Kashmir, was also conquered in 1620.

Death 

A lifelong user of opium and wine, Jahangir was frequently ill in the 1620s. Jahangir was trying to restore his health by visiting Kashmir and Kabul. He went from Kabul to Kashmir but decided to return to Lahore because of a severe cold.

On the journey from Kashmir to Lahore, Jahangir died near Bhimber on October 29, 1627. To embalm and preserve his body, the entrails were removed; these were buried inside Baghsar Fort near Bhimber in Kashmir. The body was then conveyed by palanquin to Lahore and was buried in Shahdara Bagh, a suburb of that city. His tomb was commissioned by his son, Shah Jahan and is today a popular tourist attraction site.

Jahangir's death launched a minor succession crisis. While Nur Jahan desired her son-in-law, Shahryar Mirza, to take the throne, her brother Abu'l-Hassan Asaf Khan was corresponding with his son-in-law, Prince Khurram to take over the throne. To counter Nur Jahan, Abu'l Hassan put Dawar Bakhsh as the puppet ruler and confined Nur Jahan in the Shahdara. Upon his arrival in Agra in February 1628, Prince Khurram executed both Shahryar and Dawar and took the regnal name Shah Jahan (Shihab-ud-Din Muhammad Khurram).

Issue 
Jahangir's sons were:
 Khusrau Mirza (16 August 1587 – 26 January 1622) — with Shah Begum, daughter of Raja Bhagwant Das of Amber.
 Parviz Mirza (31 October 1589 – 28 October 1626)  — with Sahib Jamal Begum, daughter of Khwaja Hasan.
 Muhammad Khurram (5 January 1592  – 22 January 1666) — with Bilqis Makani, daughter of Udai Singh Of Marwar.
 Jahandar Mirza (born ) — with a concubine.
 Shahryar Mirza (16 January 1605 – 23 January 1628) — with a concubine or Bilqis Makani, daughter of Udai Singh of Marwar.

Jahangir's daughters were:
 Sultan-un-nissa Begum (25 April 1586 – 5 September 1646) — with Shah Begum, daughter of Raja Bhagwant Das of Amber.
 Iffat Banu Begum (born 6 April 1589) — with Malika Shikar Begum, daughter of Said Khan Jagatai Of Kashghar.
 Daulat-un-nissa Begum (born 24 December 1589) — with daughter of Raja Darya Malbhas.
 Bahar Banu Begum (9 October 1590 – 8 September 1653) — with Karamsi Begum, daughter of Keshav Das Rathore of Mertia.
 Begum Sultan Begum (born 9 October 1590) — with Bilqis Makani, daughter of Udai Singh Of Marwar.
 A daughter (born 21 January 1591) — with Sahib Jamal Begum, daughter of Khwaja Hasan.
 A daughter (born 14 October 1594) — with Sahib Jamal Begum, daughter of Khwaja Hasan.
 A daughter (born January 1595) — with daughter of Abdullah Khan Baluch.
 A daughter (born 28 August 1595) — with Nur-un-Nissa Begum, daughter of Ibrahim Husain Mirza.
 Luzzat-un-Nissa Begum (born 23 September 1597) — with Bilqis Makani, daughter of Udai Singh Of Marwar.

Religion 

Sir Thomas Roe was England's first ambassador to the Mughal court. Relations with England turned tense in 1617 when Roe warned Jahangir that if the young and charismatic Prince Shah Jahan, newly instated as the Subedar of Gujarat, turned the English out of the province, "then he must expect we would do our justice upon the seas". Shah Jahan chose to seal an official Firman allowing the English to trade in Gujarat in the year 1618.

Many contemporary chroniclers were not sure how to describe Jahangir's personal belief structure. Roe labelled him an atheist, and although most others shied away from that term, they did not feel as though they could call him an orthodox Sunni. At this time, one of those disciples happened to be the current English ambassador, though his initiation into Jahangir's inner circle was devoid of religious significance for Roe, as he did not understand the full extent of what he was doing. Jahangir hung "a picture of himself set in gold hanging at a wire gold chain" around Roe's neck. Roe thought it a "special favour, for all the great men that wear the King's image (which none may do but to whom it is given) receive no other than a medal of gold as big as six pence."

Had Roe intentionally converted, it would have caused quite a scandal in London. But since there was no intent, there was no resultant problem. Such disciples were an elite group of imperial servants, with one of them being promoted to Chief Justice. However, it is not clear that any of those who became disciples renounced their previous religion, so it is probable to see this as a way in which the emperor strengthened the bond between himself and his nobles. Despite Roe's somewhat casual use of the term 'atheist', he could not quite put his finger on Jahangir's real beliefs. Roe lamented that the emperor was either "the most impossible man in the world to be converted, or the most easy; for he loves to hear, and hath so little religion yet, that he can well abide to have any derided."

This should not imply that the multi-confessional state appealed to all, or that all Muslims were happy with the situation in India. In a book written on statecraft for Jahangir, the author advised him to direct "all his energies to understanding the counsel of the sages and to comprehending the intimations of the 'ulama.'" At the start of his regime many staunch Sunnis were hopeful, because he seemed less tolerant of other faiths than his father had been. At the time of his accession and the elimination of Abu'l Fazl, his father's chief minister and the architect of his eclectic religious stance, a powerful group of orthodox noblemen had gained increased power in the Mughal court. This included nobles especially like Shaykh Farid, Jahangir's trusted Mir Bakhshi, who held firmly the citadel of orthodoxy in Muslim India.

Most notorious was the execution of the Sikh Guru Arjan Dev, whom Jahangir had had killed in prison. His lands were confiscated and his sons imprisoned as Jahangir suspected him of helping Khusrau's rebellion. It is unclear whether Jahangir even understood what a Sikh was, referring to Guru Arjan as a Hindu, who had "captured many of the simple-hearted of the Hindus and even of the ignorant and foolish followers of Islam, by his ways and manners... for three or four generations (of spiritual successors) they had kept this shop warm." The trigger for Guru Arjan's execution was his support for Jahangir's rebel son Khusrau Mirza, yet it is clear from Jahangir's own memoirs that he disliked Guru Arjan before then: "many times it occurred to me to put a stop to this vain affair or bring him into the assembly of the people of Islam."Guru Arjan's successor Guru Hargobind was imprisoned for sometime, but released soon. He developed friendly relations with Jahangir, and accompanied him in his journey to Kashmir just before the latter's death.

Jahangir also moved swiftly to persecute Jains. One of his court historians states, “One day at Ahmadabad it was reported that many of the infidel and superstitious sect of the Seoras [Jains] of Gujarat had made several very great and splendid temples, and having placed in them their false gods, had managed to secure a large degree of respect for themselves and that the women who went for worship in those temples were polluted by them and other people. The Emperor Jahangir ordered them banished from the country, and their temples to be demolished.”

In another story narrated by Jahangir himself in his memoir, Jahangir visited Pushkar and was shocked to find a temple of a boar like deity. He was quite taken-aback. "The worthless religion of the Hindus is this," he claimed and ordered his men to destroy the idol. He also heard about a jogi doing mysterious things and he ordered his men to evict him and have the place destroyed.

According to Richard M Eaton, Emperor Jahangir issued many edicts admonishing his nobles not to convert religion of anybody by force, but the issuance of such orders also suggests that such conversions must have occurred during his rule in some measure. He continued the Mughals tradition of being scrupulously secular in outlook. Stability, loyalty, and revenue was the main focus, not the religious change among their subjects.

There are instances of Jahangir open to multi-religious influences. Jahangir used to visit a Hindu ascetic, Jadrup Gosain. In his memoirs, he writes how the ascetic made a great impression on him due to his knowledge of Vedanta and his austere life. According to Dr. Faizan Mustafa, Jahangir also used to abstain from non-vegetarian food during the 12 days of the Jain Paryushan festival out of respect for his Jain subjects.

Muqarrab Khan sent to Jahangir "a European curtain (tapestry) the like of which in beauty no other work of the Frank [European] painters has ever been seen." One of his audience halls was "adorned with European screens." Christian themes attracted Jahangir, and even merited a mention in the Tuzuk. One of his slaves gave him a piece of ivory into which had been    carved four scenes. In the last scene "there is a tree, below which the figure of the revered (hazrat) Jesus is shown. One person has placed his head at Jesus' feet, and an old man is conversing with Jesus and four others are standing by." Though Jahangir believed it to be the work of the slave who presented it to him, Sayyid Ahmad and Henry Beveridge suggest that it was of European origin and possibly showed the Transfiguration. Wherever it came from, and whatever it represented, it was clear that a European style had come to influence Mughal art, otherwise the slave would not have claimed it as his own design, nor would he have been believed by Jahangir.

Art 

Jahangir was fascinated with art and architecture. In his autobiography, the Jahangirnama, Jahangir recorded events that occurred during his reign, descriptions of flora and fauna that he encountered, and other aspects of daily life, and commissioned court painters such as Ustad Mansur to paint detailed pieces that would accompany his vivid prose. For example, in 1619, he put pen to paper in awe of a royal falcon delivered to his court from the ruler of Iran: “What can I write of the beauty of this bird's colour? It had black markings, and every feather on its wings, back, and sides was extremely beautiful,” and then recorded his command that Ustad Mansur paint a portrait of it after it perished. Jahangir bound and displayed much of the art that he commissioned in elaborate albums of hundreds of images, sometimes organized around a theme such as zoology.

Jahangir himself was far from modest in his autobiography when he stated his prowess at being able to determine the artist of any portrait by simply looking at a painting. As he said: 

Jahangir took his connoisseurship of art very seriously. He also preserved paintings from Emperor Akbar's period. An excellent example of this is the painting done by Ustad Mansur of Musician Naubat Khan, son in law of legendary Tansen. In addition to their aesthetic qualities, paintings created under his reign were closely catalogued, dated and even signed, providing scholars with fairly accurate ideas as to when and in what context many of the pieces were created.

In the foreword to W. M. Thackston's translation of the Jahangirnama, Milo Cleveland Beach explains that Jahangir ruled during a time of considerably stable political control, and had the opportunity to order artists to create art to accompany his memoirs that were “in response to the emperor's current enthusiasms”. He used his wealth and his luxury of free time to chronicle, in detail, the lush natural world that the Mughal Empire encompassed. At times, he would have artists travel with him for this purpose; when Jahangir was in Rahimabad, he had his painters on hand to capture the appearance of a specific tiger that he shot and killed, because he found it to be particularly beautiful.

The Jesuits had brought with them various books, engravings, and paintings and, when they saw the delight Akbar held for them, sent for more and more of the same to be given to the Mughals. They felt the Mughals were on the "verge of conversion", a notion which proved to be very false. Instead, both Akbar and Jahangir studied this artwork very closely and replicated and adapted it, adopting much of the early iconographic features and later the pictorial realism for which Renaissance art was known. Jahangir was notable for his pride in the ability of his court painters. A classic example of this is described in Sir Thomas Roe's diaries, in which the Emperor had his painters copy a European miniature several times creating a total of five miniatures. Jahangir then challenged Roe to pick out the original from the copies, a feat Sir Thomas Roe could not do, to the delight of Jahangir.

Jahangir was also revolutionary in his adaptation of European styles. A collection at the British Museum in London contains seventy-four drawings of Indian portraits dating from the time of Jahangir, including a portrait of the emperor himself. These portraits are a unique example of art during Jahangir's reign because faces were not drawn in full, including the shoulders as well as the head as these drawings are.‘’

Public health and medicine  
Jahangir took great interest in public health and medicine. Just after his accession, he passed twelve orders, of which at least 2 were related to this area. The fifth order forbade manufacturing and sale of Rice-Spirit and any kind of intoxicating drugs, and the tenth order was instrumental in laying the foundation of free hospitals and appointment of physicians in all the great cities of his empire.

Criticism 
Jahangir is widely considered to have been a weak and incapable ruler. Orientalist Henry Beveridge (editor of the Tuzk-e-Jahangiri) compares Jahangir to the Roman emperor Claudius, for both were "weak men... in their wrong places as rulers... [and had] Jahangir been head of a Natural History Museum,... [he] would have been [a] better and happier man." Further he notes, "He made no addition to the imperial territories, but on the contrary, diminished them by losing Qandahar to the Persians. But possibly his  peaceful temper, or his laziness,  was an advantage, for it saved much bloodshed. His greatest fault as a king was his subservience to his  wife, Nur-Jahan, and the consequent quarrel with  his son, Shah Jahan, who was the ablest and best of his male children". Sir William Hawkins, who visited Jahangir's court in 1609, said: "In such short that what this man's father, called Ecber Padasha [Badshah Akbar], got of the Deccans, this king, Selim Sha [Jahangir] beginneth to lose." Italian writer and traveller, Niccolao Manucci, who worked under Jahangir's grandson, Dara Shikoh, began his discussion of Jahangir by saying: "It is a truth tested by experience that sons dissipate what their fathers gained in the sweat of their brow."

According to John F. Richards, Jahangir's frequent withdrawal to a private sphere of life was partly reflective of his indolence, brought on by his addiction to a considerable daily dosage of wine and opium.

In media

Films and television 
 In the 1939 Hindi film Pukar, Jehangir was portrayed by Chandra Mohan.
 In the 1953 Hindi film Anarkali, he was portrayed by Pradeep Kumar.
 In the 1955 Hindi film Adil-E-Jahangir, he was portrayed by D. K. Sapru.
 In the 1955 Telugu film Anarkali, he was portrayed by ANR.
 In the 1960 Hindi film Mughal-e-Azam, he was portrayed by Dilip Kumar. Jalal Agha also played the younger Jahangir at the start of the film.
 In the 1966 Malayalam film Anarkali, he was portrayed by Prem Nazir.
 In the 1979 Telugu film Akbar Salim Anarkali, he was portrayed by Balakrishna.
 In the 1988 Shyam Benegal's TV Series Bharat Ek Khoj, he was portrayed by Vijay Arora.
 Jahangirer Swarnamudra is a detective story about a missing gold coin of Jahangir written by Indian filmmaker Satyajit Ray, starring his famous character Feluda. It was adapted as a television film in 1998.
 In the 2000 TV series Noorjahan, he was portrayed by Milnd Soman.
 In the 2013 Ekta Kapoor's TV Series Jodha Akbar, he was portrayed by Ravi Bhatia. Ayaan Zubair Rahmani also played young Salim initially.
 In the 2014 Indu Sudaresan's TV Series Siyaasat, he was portrayed by Karanvir Sharma and Later Sudhanshu Pandey.
 In the 2014 Indian television sitcom Har Mushkil Ka Hal Akbar Birbal, Pawan Singh portrayed the role of prince Salim.
 In the 2018 Colors TV series  Dastaan-E-Mohabbat Salim Anarkali, he is portrayed by Shaheer Sheikh.
 In the 2023 ZEE5's web series Taj: Divided by Blood, he is portrayed by Aashim Gulati.

Literature 
 Jahangir is a principal character in Indu Sundaresan's award-winning historical novel The Twentieth Wife (2002) as well as in its sequel The Feast of Roses (2003).
 Jahangir is a principal character in Alex Rutherford's novel Ruler of the World (2011) as well as in its sequel The Tainted Throne (2012) of the series Empire of the Moghul.
 Jahangir is a character in novel Nur Jahan's Daughter (2005) written by Tanushree Poddar.
 Jahangir is a character in the novel Beloved Empress Mumtaz Mahal: A Historical Novel by Nina Consuelo Epton.
 Jahangir is a principal character in the novel Nurjahan: A historical novel by Jyoti Jafa.
 Jahangir is a character in the novel Taj, a Story of Mughal India by Timeri Murari.

Works online

See also 
 Jahangirnama
 Hiran Minar
 Sheikhupur, Badaun

References

Further reading

External links 

 
 Jehangir and Shah Jehan
 The World Conqueror: Jahangir
 Jains and the Mughals

1569 births
1627 deaths
17th-century Indian monarchs
Mughal emperors
People from Agra
Akbar
Mariam-uz-Zamani
Indian Sunni Muslims
1605 in India
17th-century memoirists
People from Lahore